The Nigeria national handball team is the national team of Nigeria. It takes part in international handball competitions.

The team participated at the 1999 World Men's Handball Championship, where they placed 23rd.

Results

World Championship
1999 – 23rd place

African Championship

IHF Emerging Nations Championship
2019 – 7th place
2023 – Qualified

External links
IHF profile

Handball
Men's national handball teams